Khalid ibn Abi Habib al-Fihri (?-October, 740) was an Arab military commander in North Africa during the Berber Revolt, who led the Arab army that was defeated at the Battle of the Nobles in late 740. 
The chronicles are oddly ambiguous on the biographical details of Khalid ibn Abi Habib.  It is acknowledged (e.g. Ibn Khaldun, p. 360) that he was a member of the illustrious Fihrid family, descendants of the great Arab conqueror Oqba ibn Nafi al-Fihri.  The patronymic structure suggests Khalid is the son of the father of Habib, which would imply that it is likely Khalid was the brother of Habib ibn Abi Obeida al-Fihri, the principal military commander of Ifriqiya. But this is not confirmed.

When the Berber Revolt of Maysara al-Matghari broke out in Morocco in 740, the bulk of the Ifriqiyan army, under the commander Habib ibn Abi Obeida al-Fihri was overseas, on campaign in Sicily.  The governor of Ifriqiya Ubayd Allah ibn al-Habhab immediately dispatched instructions to Habib break off the expedition and ship the army back to Africa.  But this would take time, and the rebels had, in the meantime, taken Tangiers and seized the whole length of Morocco.  To keep the Berber rebels in check until the Sicilian expedition army returned, Obeid Allah assembled a cavalry-heavy column composed largely of the aristocratic Arab elite of Kairouan, and placed it under the command of Khalid ibn Abi Habib.  This column was dispatched immediately to Tangiers and instructed to serve as the vanguard until the Sicilian expeditionary force under Habib disembarked and caught up with them.

Khalid ibn Abi Habib encountered the Berber rebel army in the outskirts of Tangiers, and after a couple of skirmishes, forced them to pull back.  As per the instructions he was given, Khalid held his position south of Tangiers, awaiting the reinforcements from Sicily.  But before junction could be made, the Berber rebel army, under a new commander, Khalid ibn Hamid al-Zanati, fell upon the Arab column in October/November 740.  Khalid ibn Abi Habib and his column, the flower of the Ifriqiyan nobility, was annihilated by the Berbers in what became known as the Battle of the Nobles.

See also
Fihrids
Battle of the Nobles
Berber Revolt

Notes

References

Sources
Ibn Khaldun, Histoire des Berbères et des dynasties musulmanes de l'Afrique, 1852 trans., Algiers.

Generals of the Umayyad Caliphate
Berber Revolt
8th-century Arabs
740 deaths
Arab generals
Medieval Arabs killed in battle
Year of birth unknown
Fihrids